Open Colleges Australia (OC) is an online vocational education organisation based in Australia. Open Colleges was previously known as Cengage Education, formerly International Correspondence Schools (ICS), the first distance education provider registered in Australia.

OC offers online courses covering subjects including business, health, childhood education, trades, design, and technology. In the last decade, OC has trained over 450,000 students.

History

Originally established as the International Correspondence Schools in Australia, the company was bought by Harcourt Learning Direct in 1997, and then by Thomson Education Direct in 2001 and became a part of Thomson Learning. The company name was changed to Thomson Education Direct.

In 2007, Thomson Learning was acquired by a private equity consortium consisting of Apax Partners and OMERS Capital Partners and the name was changed to Cengage Learning in July 2007. Thomson Education Direct was renamed Cengage Education.

In November 2010 Cengage Learning entered into an agreement with the Open Colleges Group for the sale of Cengage Education.

In December 2013, Apollo Group acquired a majority stake in Open Colleges Group.

Subsidiaries

Open Colleges has developed two distinct subsidiaries upon acquiring Cengage Education in 2010.
 Integrated Care & Management Training (ICMT) is a provider of education and training in the Health and Community Services sectors
 YourLife Health & Learning Inc t/a Open Colleges School of Health ABN 39 742 738 429 RTO 40049 CRICOS Provider 03733E

References

Vocational education in Australia
1895 establishments in Australia
Organisations based in Sydney